The discography of 116, formerly known as 116 Clique, a Christian hip hop collective originating from Dallas, Texas, consists of six studio albums, one of which was a remix album, one remixed extended play (EP), twenty singles, seven music videos, and one video album. The collective formed in 2005 under the auspices of Reach Records, and released its first album, The Compilation Album, that year on December 27. The following year, a remixed version of the album by DJ Primo was released on July 6. A third album, 13 Letters, followed on June 19, 2007, which charted at No. 10 on the Billboard Top Gospel Albums chart and No. 29 on the Billboard Top Christian Albums chart, as well as the remix EP Amped on August 28. Man Up was released on September 27, 2011. A Christmas album, The Gift: A Christmas Compilation, was released on November 23, 2018, and charted at No. 27 on the Christian Albums chart. The Gift: Live Sessions, a live video album recorded at the 1971 studios in Atlanta, was released on November 28, 2019. The sixth album from the collective, Sin Vergüenza, a collaboration between Reach and No Apologies Music and a combination of continental United States hip hop and Latin American urbano, was released on October 23, 2020. All twelve tracks from the recording were released as singles.

Studio albums 
"—" denotes releases that did not chart

EPs

Singles 
"—" denotes releases that did not chart

Other charted songs 
"—" denotes releases that did not chart

Guest appearances

Music videos

Video albums

References 

Hip hop discographies
Discographies of American artists
Christian music discographies